Kelli Waite (born 22 March 1985) is an Australian swimmer.

Career
Waite first competed for Australia at the 2002 Commonwealth Games in Manchester where she won bronze in the 200 metre breaststroke in 2:28.58 finishing behind fellow Australian Leisel Jones.

She competed in the 2002 Pan Pacific Swimming Championships in Yokohama, Japan, making the finals both the 100 and 200 metre breaststroke events.

References

1985 births
Living people
Australian female breaststroke swimmers
Commonwealth Games bronze medallists for Australia
Swimmers at the 2002 Commonwealth Games
Commonwealth Games medallists in swimming
Place of birth missing (living people)
Commonwealth Games silver medallists for Australia
20th-century Australian women
21st-century Australian women
Medallists at the 2002 Commonwealth Games